This is a list of cricket players who have played representative cricket for Kandurata in Sri Lanka. Kandurata cricket team was founded in 1990. Kandurata has also competed under the name Central Province.

It includes players that have played at least one match, in senior First-Class, List A cricket, or Twenty20 matches. Practice matches are not included, unless they have officially been classified at First-class tour matches.

The Inter-Provincial Cricket Tournament is the premier domestic cricket competition in Sri Lanka. It was founded in 1990.

First-class players
All of the Players who have represented Kandurata in First-Class domestic competitions:

List A players
All of the Players who have represented Kandurata in List A cricket domestic one day competitions:

Twenty20 players
All of the Players who have represented Kandurata in Twenty20 domestic competitions:

External links
Players Who Have Played For Central Province
Players Who Have Played For Kandurata
Sri Lanka Cricket

Kandurata cricketers
Kandurata